Steven Garth Selsky (born July 20, 1989) is an American former professional baseball outfielder. He has played in Major League Baseball (MLB) for the Cincinnati Reds and Boston Red Sox.

Career

Amateur
Selsky played college baseball at the University of Arizona. He was drafted by the Colorado Rockies in the 34th round of the 2010 Major League Baseball Draft but did not sign and returned to Arizona. In 2009, he played collegiate summer baseball in the Cape Cod Baseball League for the Yarmouth-Dennis Red Sox and the Orleans Firebirds, and returned to the league in 2010 and 2011 to play again for the Firebirds.

Cincinnati Reds
He was drafted by the Cincinnati Reds in the 33rd round of the 2011 MLB Draft, and was called up to the major leagues for the first time on May 20, 2016. On January 19, 2017, Selsky was designated for assignment by the Reds.

Boston Red Sox
Selsky was claimed off waivers by the Boston Red Sox on January 25, 2017. He was designated for assignment on August 23, 2017. He elected free agency on November 6, 2017. He re-signed with the Red Sox on February 7, 2018, on a minors contract. He was released on March 31, 2018.

Second stint with Cincinnati Reds
On April 9, 2018, Selsky signed a minor-league contract with the Cincinnati Reds. He elected free agency on November 2, 2018.

Personal
Selsky's father, Steve Sr., played baseball for several Chicago White Sox minor league affiliates. His mother, Lou Ann, was part of the national volleyball team in 1980 and went to the world games. His oldest sister, Stesha, was a volleyball player at the University of Michigan. His twin sister, Samantha, was a two-time All-American at the University of Dayton. His wife, Brittany, was also a soccer player at his alma mater, the University of Arizona.

References

External links

Arizona Wildcats bio

1989 births
Living people
Sportspeople from Manhattan Beach, California
Baseball players from California
Major League Baseball outfielders
Cincinnati Reds players
Boston Red Sox players
Arizona Wildcats baseball players
Orleans Firebirds players
Yarmouth–Dennis Red Sox players
Arizona League Reds players
Billings Mustangs players
Dayton Dragons players
Bakersfield Blaze players
Pensacola Blue Wahoos players
Louisville Bats players
Pawtucket Red Sox players
Águilas de Mexicali players
American expatriate baseball players in Mexico